Tony Spencer Richards (born 17 September 1973) is an English former footballer who played in the Football League for Barnet, Cambridge United, Leyton Orient and Southend United.

References

1973 births
Living people
English footballers
Association football forwards
English Football League players
Footballers from the London Borough of Newham
West Ham United F.C. players
Hong Kong Rangers FC players
Sligo Rovers F.C. players
Sudbury Town F.C. players
Cambridge United F.C. players
Leyton Orient F.C. players
Barnet F.C. players
Southend United F.C. players